Cyrtodactylus mcdonaldi  is a species of gecko, a lizard in the family Gekkonidae. The species is endemic to Queensland in Australia.

Etymology
The specific name, mcdonaldi, is in honor of Australian herpetologist Keith R. McDonald.

Habitat
The preferred natural habitats of C. mcdonaldi are forest, rocky areas, savanna, and freshwater wetlands.

Description

Diet
C. mcdonaldi preys mainly upon invertebrates such as beetles and their larvae, roaches, spiders, and scorpions.

Reproduction
The mode of reproduction of C. mcdonaldi is unknown.

References

Further reading
Cogger HG (2014). Reptiles and Amphibians of Australia, Seventh Edition. Clayton, Victoria, Australia: CSIRO Publishing. xxx + 1,033 pp. .
Shea G, Couper P, Wilmer JW, Amey A (2011). "Revision of the genus Cyrtodactylus Gray, 1827 (Squamata: Gekkonidae) in Australia". Zootaxa 3146: 1–63. (Cyrtodactylus mcdonaldi, new species, pp. 34–40, Figures 17–18).
Wilson S, Swan G (2013). A Complete Guide to Reptiles of Australia, Fourth Edition. Sydney: New Holland Publishers. 522 pp. .

Cyrtodactylus
Reptiles described in 2011
Taxa named by Patrick J. Couper